Florin Surugiu (born 10 December 1984 in Bucharest, Romania) is a Romanian rugby union player. He plays in the scrum-half position for amateur SuperLiga club CSM București and București based European Challenge Cup side the Wolves. Surugiu also plays for Romania's national team the Oaks.

Surugiu made his international debut in 2008 as a substitute against Uruguay. He played for Romania in the IRB Nations Cup and in their 2011 Rugby World Cup qualifying before appearing for them in the 2011 Rugby World Cup. He played three Tests at the World Cup, one as a substitute against Scotland and two in the scrum-half position against Argentina and Georgia.

References

External links

1984 births
Romanian rugby union players
Romania international rugby union players
București Wolves players
CSA Steaua București (rugby union) players
CSM București (rugby union) players
Rugby Calvisano players
Rugby union scrum-halves
Living people